Harry Bjørnholm (20 July 1891 – 20 November 1961) was a Danish modern pentathlete. He competed at the 1920 Summer Olympics.

References

External links
 

1891 births
1961 deaths
Danish male modern pentathletes
Olympic modern pentathletes of Denmark
Modern pentathletes at the 1920 Summer Olympics
Emigrants from the Russian Empire to Denmark